Winston Bryant (born October 3, 1938) is an American politician and attorney who served as the Secretary of State of Arkansas (1977–1978), the 14th Lieutenant Governor of Arkansas (1981–1991) and Arkansas Attorney General (1991–1999).

Early life and education 
He was born in Malvern, Arkansas. In 1960, Bryant graduated from Ouachita Baptist University in Arkadelphia. He graduated in 1963 from University of Arkansas School of Law in Fayetteville. He received a Master of Laws in Administrative Law from George Washington University Law School in 1970.

Career 
Bryant served as a legislative assistant to the late U.S. Senator John L. McClellan from 1968 to 1971. Thereafter, he was a prosecuting attorney in his native Hot Spring County and a member of the Arkansas House of Representatives from 1973 to 1977.

Elected Secretary of State in 1976, he vacated the office after one term, describing it as "a glorified janitor's job." He unsuccessfully ran for the U.S. House of Representatives from Arkansas' Fourth District on 1978 which was being vacated by Ray Thornton, who ran for the U.S. Senate. Bryant led the five-man primary, but lost in a runoff to Union County Prosecuting Attorney Beryl Anthony Jr. He was elected lieutenant governor in 1980 and served one term under Republican governor Frank White and four terms under Democrat Bill Clinton before being elected attorney general in 1990. He won 55–45% for the post over future Congressman and governor Asa Hutchinson, and was renominated in the 1994 Democratic primary 58-42% over State Representative (and future U.S. Senator) Mark Pryor. Bryant triumphed in the ordinarily heavily Republican year by a margin of 80–20% over his GOP opponent, Dan Ivy, an attorney and former Democrat.

While serving as attorney general, Bryant waged two separate campaigns for the United States Senate. In 1996, he ran for the seat being vacated by Senator David Pryor. He received the Democratic nomination in a close runoff primary against State Senator and future University of Central Arkansas president Lu Hardin, but lost in a close race to Republican Congressman Tim Hutchinson. When Arkansas's other senator, Dale Bumpers, retired before the 1998 election, Bryant once again ran in the Democratic primary. He placed second in the initial balloting, and lost the run-off to former Representative Blanche Lincoln who went on to defeat Republican state Senator Fay Boozman in the general election. After his defeat by Lincoln, he finished his term as attorney general and retired to his law practice in Malvern.

Personal life 
He is married to the former Susan Hughes and has one son, John Bryant. He enjoyed watching his great nephews play baseball.

References

1938 births
Living people
Arkansas Attorneys General
Lieutenant Governors of Arkansas
Democratic Party members of the Arkansas House of Representatives
Secretaries of State of Arkansas
United States Army officers
Ouachita Baptist University alumni
University of Arkansas School of Law alumni
George Washington University Law School alumni
People from Malvern, Arkansas